The following is a list of managers of the Cork senior hurling team and their major honours.

Managers

References

Managers
Hurling
Cork